When a vacuum tube circuit malfunctions and draws excessive current, the anode ("plate") may overheat, sometimes causing a visible red or orange glow. In consumer electronics, this is universally indicative that the tube is experiencing an overload condition, though the reasons for the overload may vary.

Some high-powered vacuum tubes (e.g. large transmitter or induction heating tubes) have silica envelopes and/or graphite or zirconium coated tantalum plates which are intended to operate at glowing temperatures and thus employ radiation cooling. The zirconium plate coating acts as a getter, and proper getter action in these tubes depends on the plate running at high temperatures. Such tubes may develop excessive gas content if underloaded for long periods of time. One trade name for this type of plate coating is Eimac's "pyrovac".

Causes
In consumer equipment, it is usually a sign of a shorted or badly mistuned load, or a badly out-of-bias condition. When testing, repairing or restoring vacuum tube-based equipment, it is wise to watch the plates of all the tubes for this condition.

Dangers
If the tube is overloaded, not only can the plate warp, causing a short to outer grids or beam-shaping elements, but the emissive layer on the cathode will be consumed very quickly. The equipment's power supply and the tube's load (output transformers, flyback transformers, etc.) are likely to be damaged by a sustained overload condition, so power should be immediately disconnected when a glowing plate is found.

Common Occurrences
In modern-day repair and maintenance of early tube-based consumer electronics devices, a glowing plate will be rarely encountered. As a visible symptom of a destructive failure, checking for an overheated tube is essential to ensure the safe and reliable operation of the equipment undergoing maintenance. 

Most frequently, a glowing plate overload will be found in rectifiers and output tubes. In particular: 
Rectifier tubes (5U4, 80, etc.), usually due to shorted capacitors or other substantial short circuits within the device. The power supply's output may be easily disconnected from the rest of the circuit in order to determine whether the overload is occurring in the supply or elsewhere.
Horizontal and vertical output tubes in television sets (6CD6, 21LU8, etc.), usually due to a shorted coupling capacitor upsetting the bias or the driving oscillator operating well out of its design range. Deflection yokes are sometimes faulty.
Horizontal output tubes may also be overloaded by a flyback transformer with shorted turns, a defective damper (i.e. 6W4), high voltage rectifier (i.e. 1B3) or high voltage regulator (i.e. 6BK4) tube.
Early color television receivers also used a complex dynamic convergence system, which was driven by both the horizontal and vertical output stages. Failure of part of this system could overload either tube, though this author has never seen such a failure in person.
Audio output tubes in radios, stereos, public address systems and guitar amplifiers (50C5, 6L6, etc.), usually due to a bad coupling capacitor upsetting the bias or a shorted load.

If any tube presents a glowing plate, the equipment should be shut down immediately to avoid further damage.

Vacuum tubes
Electrodes